The Leidsepoort is a former landmark city gate in Amsterdam, the Netherlands, formerly located at what today is the Leidseplein.

It was built in 1664 after a design by the city architect Daniël Stalpaert in 1664. It was torn down for traffic purposes in 1862.

References

External links 
 

City gates
History of Amsterdam
Gates in the Netherlands
Former buildings and structures in the Netherlands
1664 establishments in the Dutch Republic